Manifesto of Pau-Brasil Poetry (also translated as Manifesto of Brazilwood Poetry) is a Portuguese language article by Brazilian author, Oswald de Andrade. It was first published in the Correio da Manha on March 18, 1924 with the Portuguese title "Manifesto da poesia pau-brasil." An English language translation by Stella m. de sa Rego was published in the Latin American Literary Review, vol. XIV, no. 27, Jan – June 1986, pg 184 - 187.

References

Brazilian poetry
Portuguese-language literature
1924 documents
Novels by Oswald de Andrade